Desire Under the Elms, subtitled "An American Folk Opera in Three Acts", is an opera by Edward Thomas (b. 1924) which premiered in Connecticut in 1978. It is based on Eugene O'Neill's drama Desire Under the Elms, itself based on Hippolytus by Euripides.

Recordings
Thomas :  Desire Under the Elms  Jerry Hadley, James Morris, Victoria Livengood, Mel Ulrich, Jeffrey Lentz, Darth Meadows. London Symphony Orchestra, George Manahan 2003 Naxos

References

Operas
Folk operas
Adaptations of works by Eugene O'Neill
Modern adaptations of works by Euripides
Operas based on works by Euripides
Works based on Hippolytus (play)